Saint-Ambroise is a Roman Catholic parish church located in the 11th arrondissement in eastern Paris. It is dedicated to St. Ambrose.

Saint-Ambroise gave the neighborhood its name, the quartier Saint-Ambroise. The church is 87 metres in length, and its towers are 68 metres high.

History

Construction and consecration 
Located at 71 Boulevard Voltaire, Saint-Ambroise was built between 1863 and 1868, shortly after the construction of the new Boulevard du Prince-Eugène, which was later renamed Boulevard Voltaire. It replaced a church called Notre-Dame de la Procession which was located close to the path of the new street at about the location of the public garden. The church was designed by architect Théodore Ballu in an eclectic style.

Saint-Ambroise was consecrated by cardinal Léon-Adolphe Amette on 7 December 1910.

Occupation 
On 18 March 1996 the church was occupied by about three hundred African immigrants who demanded regularization of their immigration status. After four days the group was ordered to leave by public authorities. A similar situation arose at the église Saint-Bernard.

Garden and sculpture 
In front of the church a small public garden includes a sculpture honoring sixty years of Catholic Aid, donated by local residents and sculpted by G. Chance.

External links 

Roman Catholic churches in the 11th arrondissement of Paris